Brito Sport Clube is a Portuguese sports club from Brito.

The men's football team plays in the Campeonato de Portugal. Earlier they also had a stint in the Terceira Divisão from 2005 to 2008.

References

Football clubs in Portugal
Football clubs in São Miguel Island